This Sitcom Is...Not to Be Repeated is a Canadian comedy television series, which aired on The Comedy Network in 2001. Created by and starring Ed Sahely, Kathy Greenwood and Jonathan Wilson based on their stage show Not to Be Repeated, the series incorporated improvisational comedy techniques.

Each episode of the series was structured as a sitcom episode with a narrative framework, but at various points the actors would be called upon to draw lines submitted by viewers out of a hat, and incorporate them into the dialogue. Fifteen episodes of the show were produced.

Episodes

References

External links 

2000s Canadian comedy television series
2001 Canadian television series debuts
2001 Canadian television series endings
CTV Comedy Channel original programming
Improvisational television series